Central African National Olympic and Sports Committee (IOC code: CAR) is the National Olympic Committee representing Central African Republic.

See also
 Central African Republic at the Olympics

References

Central African Republic
Central African Republic at the Olympics